Thomas Oakes may refer to:

Thomas Oakes (engineer) (died 1823), Chief Engineer of the Schuylkill Navigation Company in the early 19th century
Thomas Oakes (footballer) (1874–?), English footballer of the 1890s
Thomas Oakes (representative) (1644–1719), Speaker of the Massachusetts House of Representatives from 1705–1706
Thomas Fletcher Oakes (1843–1919), President of the Northern Pacific Railroad in the late 19th century